Super League XXI commenced on 4 February 2016 and ended on 8 October with the Super League Grand Final. It consisted of 23 regular season games, 9 rounds of relevant play-offs which included the Grand Final. Wigan Warriors are the current champions after successfully defeating Warrington Wolves 12–6 in front of a capacity crowd of 70,202 at Old Trafford.

Regular season

Round 1

Round 2

Catch up Round 11
This round is played by the teams entering the Challenge Cup in the 5th Round draw which will be played during Round 11.

Round 3

Round 4

Round 5

Round 6

Round 7 (Easter Weekend)

Round 8 (Easter Monday)

Round 9

Round 10

Round 11

Round 12

Round 13

Round 14

Round 15 (Magic Weekend)

Robert Hicks was replaced by fourth official Joe Cobb on 18 minutes due to injury

Round 16

Round 17

Round 18

Round 19

Round 20

Round 21

Round 22

Round 23

Super 8s

Super League
 
The Super League Super 8s sees the top 8 teams from the Super League play 7 games each. Each team's points are carried over and after 7 additional games the top 4 teams will contest the play off semi-finals with the team in 1st hosting the team in 4th, and the team finishing 2nd hosting the 3rd placed team; the winners of these semi-finals will contest the Super League Grand Final at Old Trafford.

Round 1

Round 2

Round 3

Round 4

Round 5

Round 6

Round 7

Standings

(C) = Champions

(L) = League Leaders

(Q) = Qualified for playoffs

(U) = Unable to qualify for playoffs

Play-offs

Round 2

Round 3

Round 4

Round 5

Round 6

Round 7

References

External links
http://www.rugby-league.com/superleague/results

Results